Mian Iftikhar Hussain is a Pashtun nationalist politician who is a senior leader of the Awami National Party (ANP).

He has served as the spokesperson of the Pakistan Democratic Movement (PDM), an anti-establishment coalition of political parties in Pakistan.

Early life 
Iftikhar was born on 15 April 1958 in Pabbi, Nowshera, Pakistan. He completed his masters in Pashto from the University of Peshawar. He was the student leader of the Pashtun Students Federation (PSF).

In July 2010, he and his family were targeted by extremists in two separate attacks the first of which included the murder of his only son in a targeted attack. After the martyrdom of his lone son he formed Rashid Shaheed Foundation to help the new generation in Education and to restore and to preach Peace Education.

Political career 
In 1990, Iftikhar was elected to the Provincial Assembly of KPK. He has been elected three times to the Provincial Assembly of KPK in 1990, 1997 and 2008. Iftikhar has previously served as the Awami National Party's Provincial General Secretary and the Secretary of Information. general secretary and secretary of information. Currently he is serving as Central Secretary General of the Awami National Party and is also the spokesperson of PDM.

He serves as ANP's provincial information minister for Khyber Pakhtunkhwa, Pakistan.

References

Pashtun people
Awami National Party politicians
Provincial ministers of Khyber Pakhtunkhwa
1958 births
Living people
People from Nowshera District
University of Peshawar alumni